Christine Musselin (born 10 February 1958) is French sociologist specializing in the sociology of organizations.

From 2002 to 2010 she was the director of the Center for the Sociology of Organizations (Paris). 

From 2011 to 2018 Musselin headed the research department of Sciences Po Paris.

Select bibliography
 En quête d'universités, Paris, l'Harmattan, 1989, with Erhard Friedberg.
 L’État face aux universités, Paris, Anthropos, 1993, with Erhard Friedberg.
 The long March of French Universities, New York, Routledge, 2004.
 The markets for academics, New York, Routledge, 2010.
"La grande course des universités", Paris, Presse de Sciences Po, 2017.

External links
Curriculum vitae on the website of the Center for the Sociology of Organizations

References

1958 births
Living people
People from Fontenay-sous-Bois
French sociologists
French women sociologists
Sciences Po alumni
Academic staff of Sciences Po